This is a list of disasters and tragic events in modern Sweden sorted by death toll.

225,000-500,000 or less

50 to 99 deaths

10 to 49 deaths

Significant incidents resulting in fewer than 10 deaths

Significant incidents of Swedes being killed overseas
Excludes deaths attributable to war.

See also
 List of disasters in Antarctica by death toll
 List of disasters in Australia by death toll
 List of disasters in Canada by death toll
 List of disasters in Croatia by death toll
 List of disasters in Great Britain and Ireland by death toll
 List of disasters in New Zealand by death toll
 List of disasters in Poland by death toll
 List of disasters in the United States by death toll

References

Disasters by death toll
 
Sweden
Deaths in Sweden
Sweden